The conodont feeding apparatus is a series of phosphatic-mineralized elements, resembling a set of “teeth”, which are found lining the oral surface of the conodont animal.

Characteristics 
Conodonts are small (≈3 cm), jawless, superficially eel-like animals, and are early-branching members of the clade Vertebrata. "Conodont element" refers to one of the mineralized structures which are thought to be used in the consumption of foodstuff – the equivalent of teeth, although perhaps technically not actual teeth. These elements articulated together form the conodont feeding apparatus. With the notable exception of hagfish and lampreys (jawless fish) this body-plan is uncommon: Almost every known extant and fossil vertebrate uses jaws to consume its food, which the conodont animal lacks.

The conodont feeding apparatus demonstrates an uncommon solution to an important evolutionary challenge: How to acquire one's food.

For a long time, the function and arrangement of these conodont elements was enigmatic, since the whole animal was soft-bodied, with the sole exception of the mineralized elements. Upon the conodont animal's demise, the soft tissues would decompose and the individual conodont elements would separate. However, in instances of exceptional preservation the conodont elements may be recovered in articulation. By closely observing these rare specimens, Briggs et al. (1983) were able to for the first time study the anatomy of the complexes formed by the conodont elements arranged as they were in life. Other researchers have continued to revise and reinterpret this initial description.

Arrangement of conodont elements 
There are two different hypotheses for use of these structures for feeding: active predation and filter feeding.

The arrangement of elements was first reconstructed from extremely well-preserved taxa by Briggs et al. (1983), although loosely articulated conodont elements are reported as early as 1971. Conodont elements are found within the oral region of the animal, and are organized into three different groups based upon shape. These groups of shapes are termed S, M, and P elements.

The S and M elements are ramiform, elongate, and comb-like structures. An individual element has a single row of many cusps running down the midline along its top side. Approximately 10 of these conodont elements are arranged towards the animal's anterior oral surface forming an interlocking basket of cusps. Cusp may point out towards the head of the animal, or back towards the tail. The number of S and M elements present as well as the direction they point may vary by taxonomic group. M elements commonly form a symmetric horseshoe, pick-like shape. S elements are further divided into 3 subtypes:

{|
|- style="vertical-align:top;text-align:left;"
| S element   || unpaired symmetrical ramiform structures
|- style="vertical-align:top;text-align:left;"
| S element   || paired asymmetrical structures
|- style="vertical-align:top;text-align:left;"
| S element   || highly asymmetrical, bipennate structures
|}

In P elements a pectiniform row of cusps transitions into a broad flat or ridged platform moving towards the top of the element. Platforms and cusps are only found along one side of the structure. Individual elements are arranged in pairs with platforms and cusps oriented towards the animal's midline. P elements are further divided into 2 subtypes:
{|
|- style="vertical-align:top;text-align:left;"
|  Pa element   ||  blade-like structure
|- style="vertical-align:top;text-align:left;"
|  Pb element   || arched structure
|}

Hypothesized feeding modes 
Because they are associated with the oral region of the conodont animal, it is accepted that conodont elements are used in the acquisition of food. Two primary hypotheses have arisen as to how this is accomplished. One hypothesis proposed that elements acted as support structures for filamentous soft-tissues. These small filaments (cilia) would be used to filter small planktonic organisms out of the water column, analogous to the cnidoblast cells of a coral or the lophophore of a brachiopod.

An alternate hypothesis contests that the conodont elements were used to actively catch and process prey. S and M elements would open allowing prey to be captured with in the oral region of the animal. Cusps of these elements would firmly grip prey while the blade-like P elements would slice like a pair of scissors.

Current consensus supports the latter hypothesis in which elements are used for predation, not suspension feeding. Evidence for this includes the isometric growth pattern exhibited by S, M, and P elements. If the conodont animal relied upon a filter feeding strategy then this growth pattern would not provide the necessary surface area needed to support ciliated tissue as the animal grew. In more recent findings, researchers have also identified cartilaginous structures similar to those present in modern hagfish and lampreys which are both predators and scavengers.

It is possible that multiple feeding strategies may have arisen in different groups of conodonts, as they are a diverse clade. A recent paper has suggested that the conodont genus Panderodus may have utilized venom in the acquisition of prey. Evidence of longitudinal grooves are present on some conodont elements associated with the feeding apparatus of this particular animal. These sorts of grooves are analogous to those present in some extant groups of venomous vertebrates. However, this take on the feeding structure and behaviors of particular conodont animals has been slow to permeate the scientific community and may just be a superficial similarity.

Evolutionary significance 
The ability to acquire and process foodstuffs for energy is critical to the success of animals as a whole. With this in mind, the conodont feeding apparatus is evolutionarily significant for three primary reasons:

 Firstly, these elements demonstrate the first mineralized structures associated with vertebrate animals.
 Secondly, these structures are present before the rise of the jawed vertebrates. This fact has caused some researchers to call into question the relationship of the conodont group to the clade Vertebrata as a whole. However, current scientific opinion still accepts these animals as members of the vertebrates.
 Lastly, both the conodont feeding apparatus and jaws arose as solutions to the issue of how to effectively consume prey. The recovery of this complex demonstrates the diversity in body plan with which early vertebrate lineages used to deal with this problem.

References 

Conodonts
Fish anatomy